The 2014 All-Ireland Senior Camogie Championship Final is the eighty-third All-Ireland Final and the deciding match of the 2014 All-Ireland Senior Camogie Championship, an inter-county camogie tournament for the top teams in Ireland.

Trailing the Cats by five points at half time, Cork produced a stunning comeback in the second half to win their 25th title by six points.

References

Camogie
All-Ireland Senior Camogie Championship Finals
Cork county camogie team matches
Kilkenny county camogie team matches
All-Ireland Senior Camogie Championship Final
All-Ireland Senior Camogie Championship Final, 2014